Oura is a town community in the central east part of the Riverina and situated about 15 kilometres north east from Wagga Wagga and 20 kilometres south west from Wantabadgery. At the 2016 census, Oura had a population of 219 people.

Former residents
Leslie Redgrave (1882–1956)Writer, headmaster and grazier

Notes and references

Towns in the Riverina
Towns in New South Wales